Catching may refer to:

 Dave Catching (born 1961), American musician
 Łapanka, or rafle, a Nazi German practice of random arrests in Polish cities during World War II

See also
 Catch (disambiguation)
 Catchings, a surname